Mark 2 torpedo may refer to:

 Whitehead Mark 2 torpedo
 Whitehead Mark 2C torpedo
 Bliss-Leavitt Mark 2 torpedo